Terrorism in Russia has a long history starting from the time of the Russian Empire. Terrorism, in the modern sense, means violence against civilians to achieve political or ideological objectives by creating extreme fear.

Terrorism was an important tool used by Marxist revolutionaries in the early 20th century to disrupt the social, political, and economic system and enable rebels to bring down the Tzarist government.   Terrorist tactics, such as hostage-taking, were widely used by the Soviet secret agencies, most notably during the Red Terror and Great Terror campaigns, against the population of their own country, according to Karl Kautsky and other historians of Bolshevism.

Starting from the end of the 20th century, significant terrorist activity has taken place in Russia, most notably the Budyonnovsk hospital hostage crisis, the 1999 apartment bombings, the Moscow theater hostage crisis and the Beslan school siege. Many more acts of terrorism have been committed in major Russian cities, as well as the regions of Chechnya and Dagestan.

Russia has been declared a state sponsor of terrorism or terrorist state by Czechia, Estonia, Latvia, Lithuania, the Netherlands, Poland, Ukraine, the European Parliament, and the Parliamentary Assembly of the Council of Europe as a result of its actions during the invasion of Ukraine in 2022.

19th century 
German Social Democrat Karl Kautsky traces the origins of terrorism, including the terrorism seen in the Russian Empire, to the "Reign of Terror" of the French Revolution. Others emphasize the role of Russian revolutionary movements during the 19th century, especially Narodnaya Volya ("People's Will") and the Nihilist movement, which included several thousand followers.  "People's Will" organized one of the first political terrorism campaigns in history. In March 1881, it assassinated the Emperor of Russia Alexander II, who twenty years earlier had emancipated the Russian serfs.

Important ideologists of these groups were Mikhail Bakunin and Sergey Nechayev, who was described in Fyodor Dostoevsky's novel The Possessed. Nechayev argued that the purpose of revolutionary terror is not to gain the support of the masses, but on the contrary, to inflict misery and fear on the common population. According to Nechayev, a revolutionary must terrorize civilians in order to incite rebellions. He wrote:

"A revolutionary must infiltrate all social formations including the police. He must exploit rich and influential people, subordinating them to himself. He must aggravate the miseries of the common people, so as to exhaust their patience and incite them to rebel. And, finally, he must ally himself with the savage word of the violent criminal, the only true revolutionary in Russia".

"The Revolutionist is a doomed man. He has no private interests, no affairs, sentiments, ties, property nor even a name of his own. His entire being is devoured by one purpose, one thought, one passion – the revolution. Heart and soul, not merely by word but by deed, he has severed every link with the social order and with the entire civilized world; with the laws, good manners, conventions, and morality of that world. He is its merciless enemy and continues to inhabit it with only one purpose – to destroy it."

According to historian and writer Edvard Radzinsky, Nechayev's ideas and tactics were widely used by Joseph Stalin and other Russian revolutionaries.

Early 20th century
The SR Combat Organization was founded in 1902 and operated as an autonomous branch of the Socialist Revolutionary Party responsible for assassinating government officials, was led by Grigory Gershuni and operated separately from the party so as not to jeopardize its political actions. SRCO agents assassinated two Ministers of the Interior, Dmitry Sipyagin and V. K. von Plehve, Grand Duke Sergei Aleksandrovich, the Governor of Ufa N. M. Bogdanovich, and many other high-ranking officials. It has been estimated that all together in the last twenty years of the Tsarist regime (1897-1917) more than 17,000 people were killed or wounded in terror attacks.

Soviet Union

Red terror

The policy of Red Terror in Soviet Russia served to frighten the civilian population and exterminate certain social groups considered as "ruling classes" or enemies of the people. Karl Kautsky said about Red Terror: "Among the phenomena for which Bolshevism has been responsible, Terrorism, which begins with the abolition of every form of freedom of the Press, and ends in a system of wholesale execution, is certainly the most striking and the most repellent of all.. Kautsky recognized that Red Terror represented a variety of terrorism because it was indiscriminate, intended to frighten the civilian population, and included taking and executing hostages ". Martin Latsis, chief of the Ukrainian Cheka, emphasized that Red terror was an extrajudicial punishment not for specific acts, but membership in condemned social classes:
"Do not look in the file of incriminating evidence to see whether or not the accused rose up against the Soviets with arms or words. Ask him instead to which class he belongs, what is his background, his education, his profession. These are the questions that will determine the fate of the accused. That is the meaning and essence of the Red Terror."

One of the most common terrorist practices was hostage-taking.  A typical report from a Cheka department stated: "Yaroslavl Province, 23 June 1919. The uprising of deserters in the Petropavlovskaya volost has been put down. The families of the deserters have been taken as hostages. When we started to shoot one person from each family, the Greens began to come out of the woods and surrender. Thirty-four deserters were shot as an example".

1977 Moscow bombings

The 1977 Moscow bombings were allegedly organized by the Soviet KGB in Moscow to frame-up Armenian nationalists who were executed despite having an alibi.

Russian Federation

Accusations of terrorism 

Since the disappearance of the Soviet Union in 1991, the government of the Russian Federation has been frequently accused of sponsoring or inspiring terrorist activities inside the country and in other countries in order to achieve its political goals.

Former FSB officer Alexander Litvinenko, Johns Hopkins University and Hoover Institute scholar David Satter, Russian lawmaker Sergei Yushenkov, historian Yuri Felshtinsky, politologist Vladimir Pribylovsky and former KGB general Oleg Kalugin asserted that Russian apartment bombings were in fact a "false flag" attack perpetrated by the FSB (successor to the KGB) in order to legitimize the resumption of military activities in Chechnya and bring Vladimir Putin and the FSB to power. FSB operatives were actually briefly arrested in the case, but their presence at the crime scene was explained as "training". This view was disputed by philosopher Robert Bruce Ware and Richard Sakwa, but supported by historians Amy Knight and Karen Dawisha

Former FSB officer Aleksander Litvinenko and investigator Mikhail Trepashkin alleged that a Chechen FSB agent directed the Moscow theater hostage crisis in 2002.

Yulia Latynina has accused the Russian security services of staging fake terrorist attacks (with minimal casualties) to report false successes in solving those cases, instead of investigating the actual terrorist attacks.

Vyacheslav Izmailov from Novaya Gazeta has accused the Russian authorities of extorting confessions from suspect terrorists with torture, instead of engaging in genuine investigative efforts. According to him, the kidnappings of journalists and members of international NGOs in 2005 in Chechnya, along with Andrei Babitsky from Radio Free Europe, Arjan Erkel and Kenneth Glack from Doctors Without Borders were organized by FSB agents.

Alexander J. Motyl, professor of political science at Rutgers University argues that Russia's direct and indirect involvement in the violence in eastern Ukraine qualifies as a state-sponsored terrorism, and that those involved qualify as "terrorist groups."

In May 2016, Reuters published a Special Report titled "How Russia allowed homegrown radicals to go and fight in Syria" that, based on first-hand evidence, said that at least in the period between 2012 and 2014 the Russian government agencies ran a programme to facilitate and encourage Russian radicals and militants to leave Russia and go to Turkey and then on to Syria; the persons in question had joined jihadist groups, some fighting with the ISIL. According to the report, the goal has been to eradicate the risk of Islamic terrorism at home; however Russian security officials deny that terrorists were encouraged to leave Russia.

In 2018, after the poisoning of Skripals, the State Department was reportedly prepared to officially designate Russia as "state sponsor of terrorism" by US law based on the cases described above, but the work has been stopped as it was decided that it would interfere with US options in areas where it has to cooperate with Russia.

In April 2019 Security Service of Ukraine arrested 7 Russians traveling on counterfeit passports accused of preparing a car bombing against a Ukrainian military intelligence officer. One of them, traveling with fake Kyrgyzstan passport, was identified as Timur Dzortov, previously deputy chief of staff to the leader Ingushetia. Another man, responsible for actually planting the bomb in the car, accidentally triggered it and was wounded by the blast. SBU accused officer Dmitry Minayev from Russian Federal Security Service (FSB) of coordinating the group.

On February 10, 2020, seven Russian anarchists and anti-fascist activists were sentenced to six to eighteen years in prison, being housed in different penal colonies. The activist were accused to be members of "The Set" an alleged terrorist organization from Penza that aimed to "overthrow the Russian government".

1999 Russian apartment bombings

The Russian apartment bombings were a series of bombings in Russia that killed nearly 300 people and, together with the Dagestan War, led the country into the Second Chechen War. The four bombings took place in the Russian cities of Buinaksk, Moscow and Volgodonsk during early days of September 1999.

The bombings were followed by a controversial episode when a suspected bomb was found and defused in an apartment block in the Russian city of Ryazan on 22 September, which was then explained to be an exercise by the Russian security services, the FSB.

An official investigation of the bombings was completed only three years later, in 2002. Seven suspects were killed, six have been convicted on terrorism-related charges, and one remains a fugitive. According to the investigation, the Moscow and Volgodonsk bombings were organized and led by Achemez Gochiyaev, who headed a group of Karachai Wahhabis, while the Buinaksk bombing was organized and perpetrated by a different group of Dagestani Wahhabis.

The Russian Duma rejected two motions for parliamentary investigation of the Ryazan incident. An independent public commission to investigate the bombings chaired by Duma deputy Sergei Kovalev was rendered ineffective because of government refusal to respond to its inquiries. Two key members of the Kovalev Commission, Sergei Yushenkov and Yuri Shchekochikhin, both Duma members, have since died in assassinations in April 2003 and July 2003 respectively. The commission's lawyer Mikhail Trepashkin was arrested in October 2003 to become one of the better-known political prisoners in Russia.

More recent attacks

2002

The Moscow theater hostage crisis (also known as the 2002 Nord-Ost siege) was the seizure of a crowded Dubrovka Theater by 40 to 50 armed Chechens on 23 October 2002 that involved 850 hostages and ended with the deaths of at least 170 people.

2004

In September 2004, following bombing attacks on two aircraft and the downtown Moscow Metro, Chechen terrorists seized over 1,000 hostages at a school in Beslan, North Ossetia.

2006

The 2006 Moscow market bombing occurred on 21 August 2006, when a self-made bomb with the power of more than 1 kg of TNT exploded at Moscow's Cherkizovsky Market frequented by foreign merchants. The bombing killed 13 people and injured 47. In 2008, eight members of the neo-Nazi organization The Saviour were sentenced for their roles in the attack.

2010

In March 2010 suicide bombings were carried out by two women who were aligned with Caucasus Emirate and Al-Qaeda. The terrorist attack happened during the morning rush hour of 29 March 2010, at two stations of the Moscow Metro (Lubyanka and Park Kultury), with roughly 40 minutes interval between. At least 38 people were killed, and over 60 injured.

2011

The Domodedovo International Airport bombing was a suicide bombing in the international arrival hall of Moscow's Domodedovo International, in Domodedovsky District, Moscow Oblast, on 24 January 2011.

The bombing killed 37 people and injured 173 others, including 86 who had to be hospitalised. Of the casualties, 31 died at the scene, three later in hospitals, one en route to a hospital, one on 2 February after having been put in a coma, and another on 24 February after being hospitalised in grave condition.

Russia's Federal Investigative Committee later identified the suicide bomber as a 20-year-old from the North Caucasus, and said that the attack was aimed "first and foremost" at foreign citizens.

2013

In December 2013, two separate suicide bombings a day apart targeted mass transportation in the city of Volgograd, in the Volgograd Oblast of Southern Russia, killing 34 people overall, including both perpetrators who were aligned to Caucasus Emirate and Vilayat Dagestan. The attacks followed a bus bombing carried out in the same city two months earlier.

On 21 October 2013, a suicide bombing took place on a bus in the city of Volgograd, in the Volgograd Oblast of Southern Russia. The attack was carried out by a female perpetrator named Naida Sirazhudinovna Asiyalova (Russian: Наида Сиражудиновна Асиялова) who was converted to Islam by her husband, she detonated an explosive belt containing 500–600 grams of TNT inside a bus carrying approximately 50 people, killing seven civilians and injuring at least 36 others.

2014

On 5 October 2014 a 19-year-old man named Opti Mudarov went to the town hall where an event was taking place to mark Grozny City Day celebrations in Grozny coinciding with the birthday of Chechen President Ramzan Kadyrov. Police officers noticed him acting strangely and stopped him. The officers began to search him and the bomb which Mudarov had been carrying exploded. Five officers, along with the suicide bomber, were killed, while 12 others were wounded.

On 4 December 2014, a group of Islamist militants, in three vehicles, killed three traffic policemen, after the latter had attempted to stop them at a checkpoint in the outskirts of Grozny. The militants then occupied a press building and an abandoned school, located in the center of the city. Launching a counter-terrorism operation, security forces, with the use of armored vehicles, attempted to storm the buildings and a firefight ensued.

14 policemen, 11 militants and 1 civilian were killed. Additionally 36 policemen were wounded in the incident. The Press House was also burned and severely damaged in the incident.

2015

Metrojet Flight 9268 was an international chartered passenger flight operated by Russian airline Kogalymavia (branded as Metrojet). On 31 October 2015 at 06:13 local time EST (04:13 UTC), an Airbus A321-231 operating the flight disintegrated above the northern Sinai following its departure from Sharm El Sheikh International Airport, Egypt, in route to Pulkovo Airport, Saint Petersburg, Russia. All 217 passengers and seven crew members who were on board were killed.

Shortly after the crash, the Islamic State of Iraq and the Levant (ISIL)'s Sinai Branch, previously known as Ansar Bait al-Maqdis, claimed responsibility for the incident, which occurred in the vicinity of the Sinai insurgency. ISIL claimed responsibility on Twitter, on video, and in a statement by Abu Osama al-Masri, the leader of the group's Sinai branch. ISIL posted pictures of what it said was the bomb in Dabiq, its online magazine.

By 4 November 2015, British and American authorities suspected that a bomb was responsible for the crash. On 8 November 2015, an anonymous member of the Egyptian investigation team said the investigators were "90 percent sure" that the jet was brought down by a bomb. Lead investigator Ayman al-Muqaddam said that other possible causes of the crash included a fuel explosion, metal fatigue, and lithium batteries overheating. The Russians said they had found explosive residue as evidence. On 24 February 2016, Egyptian President Abdel Fattah el-Sisi acknowledged that terrorism caused the crash.

2017

On 3 April 2017, a terrorist attack using an explosive device took place on the Saint Petersburg Metro between Sennaya Ploshchad and Tekhnologichesky Institut stations. Seven people (including the perpetrator) were initially reported to have died, and eight more died later from their injuries, bringing the total to 15. At least 45 others were injured in the incident. The explosive device was contained in a briefcase. A second explosive device was found and defused at Ploshchad Vosstaniya metro station. The suspected perpetrator was named as Akbarzhon Jalilov, a Russian citizen who was an ethnic Uzbek born in Kyrgyzstan. Prior to the attack, Chechen separatists had been responsible for several terrorist attacks in Russia. In 2016, ISIS had plotted to target St. Petersburg due to Russia's military involvement in Syria, resulting in arrests. No public transport system in Russia had been bombed since the 2010 Moscow Metro bombings.ISIS propaganda was being circulated prior to this incident. It encouraged supporters to launch strikes on Moscow. ISIS propaganda showed bullet holes through Putin's head and a poster circulated before the attack of a falling Kremlin and included the message "We Will Burn Russia."

On 22 April 2017, two people were shot and killed in an attack in a Federal Security Service office in the Russian city of Khabarovsk. The gunman was also killed. The Russian Federal Security Service said that the native 18-year-old perpetrator was a known member of a neo-nazi group.

On 27 December 2017 a bomb exploded in a supermarket in St Petersburg, injuring thirteen people. Vladimir Putin described this as a terrorist attack.

2019 
Several terrorist incidents occurred in Russia during the year of 2019:

On March 13, two perpetrators opened attacked Federal Security Service (FSB) officers with automatic weapons and grenades when stopped for questioning in Stavropol of the Shpakovsky district.  Both Perpetrators where killed in the confrontation. Later, Russian authorities reported they were planning a terrorist attack in accordance to their affiliation with ISIS.

On April 8, ISIS (claimed to have) set off an explosion at Kolomna, a city near Moscow. The attack did not result in any casualties.

On July 1, ISIS claimed responsibility for an attack on a police officer at a checkpoint in the Achkhoy-Martonovsky district of Chechnya, who was stabbed to death. The attacker was shot and killed as he threw a grenade at the other officers.

On December 19, someone living in the Moscow region opened fire near the FSB headquarters in Moscow and caused 6 casualties; 2 killed and 4 wounded. Subsequently, the shooter, later identified as Yevgeny Manyurov, a 39-year-old ex-security guard, was killed onsite.

2021 
A German court sentenced Russian agent Vadim Krasikov to life imprisonment for the murder of Zelimkhan Khangoshvili which the judge called "state terrorism".

2022 
On April 14, the Ukrainian parliament endorsed a bill recognizing Russia as a terrorist state, whose political regime's aims include genocide, physical destruction, mass killings, international crimes against civilians, use of prohibited methods of war, destruction of infrastructure, and artificial humanitarian catastrophes in certain regions of Ukraine.

On May 10, Lithuania's parliament designated the Russian Federation a terrorist state and its actions in Ukraine a genocide.

On August 11, Latvia's parliament recognised Russia as a terrorist state.

The US Senate unanimously passed a nonbinding resolution to this effect on July 27, 2022, calling on the State Department to recognize Russia as a state-sponsor of terrorism for its invasions of Ukraine, as well as of Chechnya, Georgia and Syria, that caused "the deaths of countless innocent men, women and children." The US House of Congress is considering such legislation. A large international legal effort intends to use the international definition of terrorism to help win reparations from the Russian state, mercenaries, and business people for war damage in Ukraine.

Darya Dugina was killed on 20 August 2022, in a car-bombing in the settlement of Bolshiye Vyazyomy outside Moscow.

The Parliamentary Assembly of the Council of Europe adopted a resolution declaring the Russian Federation a terrorist regime, by a vote of 99 to 0, with 1 abstaining, on 13 October 2022. The European Parliament resolved to discuss the topic in November.

On October 18, parliament of Estonia declares Russia a terrorist state.

On October 25, the Polish senate recognized the Russian government as a terrorist regime.

The Foreign Affairs Committee of the Czech lower house of parliament declared the Russian regime terrorist on November 3, after resolutions condemning large-scale Russian attacks on Ukrainian civilians and critical infrastructure. On November 16, the deputies of the house passed a resolution calling Russia terrorist.

On 21 November the NATO Parliamentary Assembly unanimously passed a resolution declaring Russia a terrorist state and calling for a Special International Tribunal to investigate its crimes, and also approving of various other measures supporting Ukraine in the Russo-Ukrainian War.

On 23 November, the European Parliament declared Russia a state sponsor of terrorism and a state that uses means of terrorism.

The parliament of the Netherlands declared Russia a state sponsor of terrorism on 24 November.

On December 14, 2022, the Sejm of the Republic of Poland recognized the Russian Federation as a state sponsoring terrorism by a vote of 231:2:1. 226 deputies did not take part in the vote.

2023 
On 16 February, the Slovakia's National Council recognized the Russian government as terrorist and Russia as a state sponsor of terrorism, by a vote of 78 to 12, with 7 abstaining.

International cooperation
In December 2019 President of Russia Vladimir Putin thanked his American counterpart Donald Trump for a tip which allowed the prevention of a terrorist attack in St. Petersburg.

See also

 SR Combat Organization
 Kizlyar raid
 State-sponsored terrorism#Russia
 Russian Federation list of terrorist and extremist organizations

References

Further reading

External links
 Terrorism: A Marxist Perspective, By Dave Holmes
 Over 200 cases against Hizb ut-Tahrir activists opened in Russia
 Khanty-Mansiysk Court confirms Hizb ut-Tahrir activist's sentence
 'Big three' to hold Delhi talks
 Terrorism in Russia – slideshow by Life magazine

 
Russia
Human rights abuses in Russia